Povl Ahm CBE FICE FREng (26 September 1926 – 15 May 2005) was a structural engineer and former chairman of Ove Arup & Partners.

Life
Born in Aarhus, Denmark, Ahm attended the Polyteknisk Læreanstalt in Copenhagen, from where he graduated in 1949.

Ahm married Birgit Moller in 1953, with whom he had two sons, Carsten Ahm and Peter Ahm.

He was a keen sportsman, and a good footballer. He played for the London amateur team Corinthian-Casuals and played in the 1956 Amateur Cup Final at Wembley Stadium.

He died of cancer on 15 May 2005.

Career

He joined the firm Ove Arup and Partners in London in 1952, where he worked on Coventry Cathedral with Basil Spence. In his own words:

"It was an architectural concept showing clearly the ecclesiastical functions but without any clear definition of structural concept, for so far no engineer had been involved in the design."

Ahm was given great responsibility on this project, working directly with Ove Arup.

He also worked on early conceptual design schemes for the Sydney Opera House, and worked on other projects, including Smithfield Market, London and Centre Pompidou, Paris – some of Ove Arup & Partners' most prestigious projects.

The architect of Sydney Opera House, Jørn Utzon, later went on to design a house for Ahm in Hertfordshire - a project which avoided the many problems of Sydney Opera House.

In 1957 Ahm was made an associate partner of Ove Arup & Partners, and in 1965 he was made a full partner, becoming a director of the firm after its ownership was rearranged in 1977 (the firm was now owned in trust for the staff).

By winning the competition to design the Gateshead Viaduct in 1965, Ahm started the firm's new transport group, specialising in bridges.

From 1989 to 1992 he was chairman of the firm. He was made a Fellow of the Royal Academy of Engineering in 1981.

Ahm was an active member of the Institution of Civil Engineers, acting as a Council Member twice, and becoming Vice Chairman of Registered Engineers for Disaster Relief from 1989 to 1993. From 1992 to 1996 he was chairman of the Association of Consulting Engineers.

Notable projects

Coventry Cathedral,
St Catherine's College, Oxford, 1960
University of Sussex, 1962
44 West Common Way (Ahm House), Harpenden, Hertfordshire, 1963
Gateshead Viaduct, 1965
Centre Pompidou, 1974
British Embassy in Rome, 1975
Danish Embassy in London, 1978

Awards
Ahm was awarded the ICE's first gold medal in 1993; the same year he received a CBE for services to engineering.

He received an honorary doctorate from University of Warwick in 1994.

References

Danish civil engineers
Corinthian-Casuals F.C. players
Structural engineers
1926 births
2005 deaths
Fellows of the Royal Academy of Engineering
Association footballers not categorized by position
Danish men's footballers
Footballers from Aarhus
20th-century Danish engineers